Yael Bartana (born 1970) is an Israeli artist, filmmaker and photographer, whose past works have encompassed multiple mediums, including photography, film, video, sound, and installation. Many of her pieces feature political or feminist themes.

Bartana's works have been exhibited around the world and been part of collections at museums such as the Museum of Modern Art in New York City, the Tate Modern in London, and the Centre Pompidou in Paris.

Her film trilogy And Europe Will Be Stunned, which discusses the relationship between Judaism and Polish identity, was shown at the Polish pavilion of the 2011 Venice Biennale. She is based in Amsterdam, Berlin, and Tel Aviv.

Bartana's video art has been characterized as "challenging customary categorisations that either pin artists to their country of origin, or see them as participating in an international, increasingly globalised art scene". Her practice has also been described as engrained in the cultural landscape of Israel. "Thus, even though strongly resonating contemporary mobility, Bartana’s oeuvre, like that of many of her peers, is more migratory than global", showing that her work is representative of "difference in transition rather than universal sameness".

Career 

Between 2006 and 2011, Bartana worked in Poland, creating the trilogy And Europe Will Be Stunned, which examines 19th- and 20th-century Europe as a historic homeland for Ashkenazi Jews. This project discusses the history of Polish-Jewish relations and its influence on the contemporary Polish identity. The trilogy represented Poland in the 54th Venice Biennale, 2011, where she was the first non-Polish citizen to represent Poland. It was acquired in the permanent collection by the Solomon R. Guggenheim Foundation and the Tel Aviv Museum of Art. In recent years, Bartana has increasingly staged her films, and proposed utopic narratives for new chapters of history. Examples include What If Women Ruled the World? (2017), a live performance in which women politicians and professionals meet with a group of actresses playing the representatives of a fictional nation to come up with solutions to stop the approaching Doomsday. In 2019, The Guardian named Bartana's And Europe Will Be Stunned as one of "the best art of the 21st century".

Awards and prizes
 Artes Mundi 4 of the National Museum Cardiff, Wales (2010)
 Haagendaismo, Madrid (2010)
 Principal Prize by the International Jury and the Prize of the Ecumenical Jury at the Internationale Kurzfilmtage Oberhausen short film festival, Germany (2010)
 Nathan Gottesdiener Foundation Israeli Art Prize (2006)
 Dorothea von Stetten Kunstpreis of the Kunstmuseum Bonn in 2004

Exhibitions
 Philadelphia Museum of Art, US (2018-2019)
Pérez Art Museum Miami, USA (2013-2014)
Walker Art Center, Minneapolis, Minnesota, US (2013-2014)
 Van Abbemuseum, Eindhoven, Netherlands (2012),Yael Bartana – ... and Europe will be stunned
 Art Gallery of Ontario, Toronto, Canada (2012)
 Media City Seoul 2010, Seoul, Korea (2010)
 Moderna Museet, Malmö, Sweden (2010)
 Artes Mundi, Cardiff, Wales (2010)
 Yael Bartana at P.S.1 (2009)
 Foksal Gallery, Warsaw, Poland (2008)
 Center for Contemporary Art, Tel Aviv, Israel (2008)
 The Power Plant, Toronto, Canada (2007)
 Kunstverein Hamburg, Hamburg, Germany (2006)
 Museum St. Gallen, St. Gallen, Switzerland (2005)
 MIT List Visual Arts Center, Cambridge, Massachusetts, US (2004)

References

External links

  Yael Bartana at Solomon R. Guggenheim Museum
  Artist Talk: Yael Bartana, Guggenheim Museum, Conversations With Contemporary Artists (2012), on YouTube

1970 births
Living people
21st-century Israeli women artists
Jewish artists
Israeli contemporary artists
Israeli photographers
Israeli video artists
Lesbian photographers
Lesbian Jews
Israeli LGBT photographers
Israeli expatriates in the Netherlands
Bezalel Academy of Arts and Design alumni